Efemena Mukoro, professionally known as Blackmagic, is a Nigerian rapper, singer and songwriter.

Early life and education 
Blackmagic is a native of Delta State but was born and raised in Lagos. He attended King's College, Lagos for his secondary education and studied Computer Science from the University of Benin.

Career 
Blackmagic dropped out of school in order to pursue his music career and started out under the stage name, Ejay. He was signed to Lynxxx's Syndik8 records in 2010 as a Soul and Afrobeat musician. He went on to release multiple singles and his debut album titled Blackmagic 1.0 in 2011; he gained popularity with his single titled "Confam" which featured Sasha P. He however came to the limelight following the release of the single, "Repete" in 2013. "Repete" is described as one of the Nigerian songs with the most critical acclaim. He is considered a pioneer of the Nigerian alternative scene.

He changed his stage name over time to Ejay Blackmagic and to simply Blackmagic upon his exit from Syndik8 records. He went on to launch his own record label, Based on Belief in 2013.

Discography

Singles 

 "Tomorrow" (2010)
 "Rainbow" (2011)
 "Fantasy" (2012)
 "Repete" (2012)
 "Foreigner" 
 "Black Friday" (2015)
 "Wonder"  (2016)
 "No need"  (2018)
 "Anything for Love" (2019)

EPs 

 BM (2019 )

Albums 

 Version 1.0 (2011)
 Version 2.0 (2013)
 Black Friday (2015)
 Version 3.0 (2020)

Awards and nominations

References 

Rappers from Lagos
Nigerian songwriters
Nigerian musicians
King's College, Lagos alumni
Year of birth missing (living people)
Living people